In terrestrial zoology, the megafauna (from Greek μέγας megas "large" and New Latin fauna "animal life") comprises the large or giant animals of an area, habitat, or geological period, extinct and/or extant. The first of these include many species not popularly thought of as overly large, and being the only few large animals left in a given range/area, such as white-tailed deer, Thomson's gazelle, and red kangaroo.
In practice, the most common usage encountered in academic and popular writing describes land mammals roughly larger than a human that are not (solely) domesticated. The term is especially associated with the Pleistocene megafauna – the land animals often larger than their extant counterparts that are considered archetypical of the last ice age, such as mammoths, the majority of which in northern Eurasia, the Americas and Australia became extinct within the last forty thousand years. Among living animals, the term megafauna is most commonly used for the largest extant terrestrial mammals, which includes (but is not limited to)  elephants, giraffes, zebras, hippopotamuses, rhinoceroses, and large bovines. Of these five categories of large herbivores, only bovines are presently found outside of Africa and southern Asia, but all the others were formerly more wide-ranging, with their ranges and populations continually shrinking and decreasing over time. Wild equines are another example of megafauna, but their current ranges are largely restricted to the old world, specifically Africa and Asia. Megafaunal species may be categorized according to their dietary type: megaherbivores (e.g., elephants), megacarnivores (e.g., lions), and, more rarely, megaomnivores (e.g., bears). The megafauna is also categorized by the class of animals that it belongs to, which are mammals, birds, reptiles, amphibians, fish, and invertebrates.

Other common uses are for giant aquatic species, especially whales, as well as any of the larger wild or domesticated land animals such as larger antelope, deer, horse and cattle, as well as dinosaurs and other extinct giant reptilians.

The term megafauna is very rarely used to describe invertebrates, though it has occasionally been used for some species of invertebrates such as coconut crabs and Japanese spider crabs, as well as extinct invertebrates that were much larger than all similar invertebrate species alive today, for example the  dragonflies of the Carboniferous period.

Ecological strategy
Megafauna animals – in the sense of the largest mammals and birds – are generally K-strategists, with high longevity, slow population growth rates, low mortality rates, and (at least for the largest) few or no natural predators capable of killing adults. These characteristics, although not exclusive to such megafauna, make them vulnerable to human overexploitation, in part because of their slow population recovery rates.

Evolution of large body size
One observation that has been made about the evolution of larger body size is that rapid rates of increase that are often seen over relatively short time intervals are not sustainable over much longer time periods. In an examination of mammal body mass changes over time, the maximum increase possible in a given time interval was found to scale with the interval length raised to the 0.25 power. This is thought to reflect the emergence, during a trend of increasing maximum body size, of a series of anatomical, physiological, environmental, genetic and other constraints that must be overcome by evolutionary innovations before further size increases are possible. A strikingly faster rate of change was found for large decreases in body mass, such as may be associated with the phenomenon of insular dwarfism. When normalized to generation length, the maximum rate of body mass decrease was found to be over 30 times greater than the maximum rate of body mass increase for a ten-fold change.

In terrestrial mammals

Subsequent to the Cretaceous–Paleogene extinction event that eliminated the non-avian dinosaurs about  Ma (million years) ago, terrestrial mammals underwent a nearly exponential increase in body size as they diversified to occupy the ecological niches left vacant. Starting from just a few kg before the event, maximum size had reached ~50 kg a few million years later, and ~750 kg by the end of the Paleocene. This trend of increasing body mass appears to level off about 40 Ma ago (in the late Eocene), suggesting that physiological or ecological constraints had been reached, after an increase in body mass of over three orders of magnitude. However, when considered from the standpoint of rate of size increase per generation, the exponential increase is found to have continued until the appearance of Indricotherium 30 Ma ago. (Since generation time scales with body mass0.259, increasing generation times with increasing size cause the log mass vs. time plot to curve downward from a linear fit.)

Megaherbivores eventually attained a body mass of over 10,000 kg. The largest of these, indricotheres and proboscids, have been hindgut fermenters, which are believed to have an advantage over foregut fermenters in terms of being able to accelerate gastrointestinal transit in order to accommodate very large food intakes. A similar trend emerges when rates of increase of maximum body mass per generation for different mammalian clades are compared (using rates averaged over macroevolutionary time scales). Among terrestrial mammals, the fastest rates of increase of body mass0.259 vs. time (in Ma) occurred in perissodactyls (a slope of 2.1), followed by rodents (1.2) and proboscids (1.1), all of which are hindgut fermenters. The rate of increase for artiodactyls (0.74) was about a third that of perissodactyls. The rate for carnivorans (0.65) was slightly lower yet, while primates, perhaps constrained by their arboreal habits, had the lowest rate (0.39) among the mammalian groups studied.

Terrestrial mammalian carnivores from several eutherian groups (the artiodactyl Andrewsarchus – formerly considered a mesonychid, the oxyaenid Sarkastodon, and the carnivorans Amphicyon and Arctodus) all reached a maximum size of about 1000 kg (the carnivoran Arctotherium and the hyaenodontid Simbakubwa may have been somewhat larger). The largest known metatherian carnivore, Proborhyaena gigantea, apparently reached 600 kg, also close to this limit. A similar theoretical maximum size for mammalian carnivores has been predicted based on the metabolic rate of mammals, the energetic cost of obtaining prey, and the maximum estimated rate coefficient of prey intake. It has also been suggested that maximum size for mammalian carnivores is constrained by the stress the humerus can withstand at top running speed.

Analysis of the variation of maximum body size over the last 40 Ma suggests that decreasing temperature and increasing continental land area are associated with increasing maximum body size. The former correlation would be consistent with Bergmann's rule, and might be related to the thermoregulatory advantage of large body mass in cool climates, better ability of larger organisms to cope with seasonality in food supply, or other factors; the latter correlation could be explained in terms of range and resource limitations. However, the two parameters are interrelated (due to sea level drops accompanying increased glaciation), making the driver of the trends in maximum size more difficult to identify.

In marine mammals

Since tetrapods (first reptiles, later mammals) returned to the sea in the Late Permian, they have dominated the top end of the marine body size range, due to the more efficient intake of oxygen possible using lungs. The ancestors of cetaceans are believed to have been the semiaquatic pakicetids, no larger than dogs, of about 53 million years (Ma) ago. By 40 Ma ago, cetaceans had attained a length of 20 m or more in Basilosaurus, an elongated, serpentine whale that differed from modern whales in many respects and was not ancestral to them. Following this, the evolution of large body size in cetaceans appears to have come to a temporary halt, and then to have backtracked, although the available fossil records are limited. However, in the period from 31 Ma ago (in the Oligocene) to the present, cetaceans underwent a significantly more rapid sustained increase in body mass (a rate of increase in body mass0.259 of a factor of 3.2 per million years) than achieved by any group of terrestrial mammals. This trend led to the largest animal of all time, the modern blue whale. Several reasons for the more rapid evolution of large body size in cetaceans are possible. Fewer biomechanical constraints on increases in body size may be associated with suspension in water as opposed to standing against the force of gravity, and with swimming movements as opposed to terrestrial locomotion. Also, the greater heat capacity and thermal conductivity of water compared to air may increase the thermoregulatory advantage of large body size in marine endotherms, although diminishing returns apply.

Among toothed whales, maximum body size appears to be limited by food availability. Larger size, as in sperm and beaked whales, facilitates deeper diving to access relatively easily-caught, large cephalopod prey in a less competitive environment. Compared to odontocetes, the efficiency of baleen whales' filter feeding scales more favorably with increasing size when planktonic food is dense, making larger size more advantageous. The lunge feeding technique of rorquals appears to be more energy efficient than the ram feeding of balaenid whales; the latter technique is used with less dense and patchy plankton. The cooling trend in Earth's recent history may have generated more localities of high plankton abundance via wind-driven upwellings, facilitating the evolution of gigantic whales.

Cetaceans are not the only marine mammals to reach tremendous sizes. The sirenians are another group of marine mammals which adapted to fully aquatic life around the same time as the cetaceans did. Sirenians are closely related to elephants. The semi-aquatic hippopotamus, which is the terrestrial mammal most closely related to cetaceans, can reach .

In flightless birds

Because of the small initial size of all mammals following the extinction of the non-avian dinosaurs, nonmammalian vertebrates had a roughly ten-million-year-long window of opportunity (during the Paleocene) for evolution of gigantism without much competition. During this interval, apex predator niches were often occupied by reptiles, such as terrestrial crocodilians (e.g. Pristichampsus), large snakes (e.g. Titanoboa) or varanid lizards, or by flightless birds (e.g. Paleopsilopterus in South America). This is also the period when megafaunal flightless herbivorous gastornithid birds evolved in the Northern Hemisphere, while flightless paleognaths evolved to large size on Gondwanan land masses and Europe. Gastornithids and at least one lineage of flightless paleognath birds originated in Europe, both lineages dominating niches for large herbivores while mammals remained below 45 kg (in contrast with other landmasses like North America and Asia, which saw the earlier evolution of larger mammals) and were the largest European tetrapods in the Paleocene.

Flightless paleognaths, termed ratites, have traditionally been viewed as representing a lineage separate from that of their small flighted relatives, the Neotropic tinamous. However, recent genetic studies have found that tinamous nest well within the ratite tree, and are the sister group of the extinct moa of New Zealand. Similarly, the small kiwi of New Zealand have been found to be the sister group of the extinct elephant birds of Madagascar. These findings indicate that flightlessness and gigantism arose independently multiple times among ratites via parallel evolution.

Predatory megafaunal flightless birds were often able to compete with mammals in the early Cenozoic. Later in the Cenozoic, however, they were displaced by advanced carnivorans and died out. In North America, the bathornithids Paracrax and Bathornis were apex predators but became extinct by the Early Miocene. In South America, the related phorusrhacids shared the dominant predatory niches with metatherian sparassodonts during most of the Cenozoic but declined and ultimately went extinct after eutherian predators arrived from North America (as part of the Great American Interchange) during the Pliocene. In contrast, large herbivorous flightless ratites have survived to the present.

However, none of the flightless birds of the Cenozoic, including the predatory Brontornis, possibly omnivorous Dromornis stirtoni or herbivorous Vorombe, ever grew to masses much above 500 kg, and thus never attained the size of the largest mammalian carnivores, let alone that of the largest mammalian herbivores. It has been suggested that the increasing thickness of avian eggshells in proportion to egg mass with increasing egg size places an upper limit on the size of birds. The largest species of Dromornis, D. stirtoni, may have gone extinct after it attained the maximum avian body mass and was then outcompeted by marsupial diprotodonts that evolved to sizes several times larger.

In giant turtles
Giant tortoises were important components of late Cenozoic megafaunas, being present in every nonpolar continent until the arrival of homininans. The largest known terrestrial tortoise was Megalochelys atlas, an animal that probably weighed about 1,000 kg.

Some earlier aquatic Testudines, e.g. the marine Archelon of the Cretaceous and freshwater Stupendemys of the Miocene, were considerably larger, weighing more than 2,000  kg.

Megafaunal mass extinctions

Timing and possible causes

The Holocene extinction (see also Quaternary extinction event), occurred at the end of the last ice age glacial period (a.k.a. the Würm glaciation) when many giant ice age mammals, such as woolly mammoths, went extinct in the Americas and northern Eurasia. An analysis of the extinction event in North America found it to be unique among Cenozoic extinction pulses in its selectivity for large animals. Various theories have attributed the wave of extinctions to human hunting, climate change, disease, extraterrestrial impact, or other causes. However, this extinction near the end of the Pleistocene was just one of a series of megafaunal extinction pulses that have occurred during the last 50,000 years over much of the Earth's surface, with Africa and southern Asia (where the local megafauna had a chance to evolve alongside modern humans) being comparatively less affected. The latter areas did suffer a gradual attrition of megafauna, particularly of the slower-moving species (a class of vulnerable megafauna epitomized by giant tortoises), over the last several million years.

Outside the mainland of Afro-Eurasia, these megafaunal extinctions followed a highly distinctive landmass-by-landmass pattern that closely parallels the spread of humans into previously uninhabited regions of the world, and which shows no overall correlation with climatic history (which can be visualized with plots over recent geological time periods of climate markers such as marine oxygen isotopes or atmospheric carbon dioxide levels). Australia and nearby islands (e.g., Flores) were struck first around 46,000 years ago, followed by Tasmania about 41,000 years ago (after formation of a land bridge to Australia about 43,000 years ago). The role of humans in the extinction of Australia and New Guinea's megafauna has been disputed, with multiple studies showing a decline in the number of species prior to the peopling of the continent and the absence of any evidence of human predation. The impact of climate change has instead been cited for their decline. Stepwise  Japan apparently about 30,000 years ago, North America 13,000 years ago, South America about 500 years later, Cyprus 10,000 years ago, the Antilles 6,000 years ago, New Caledonia and nearby islands 3,000 years ago, Madagascar 2,000 years ago, New Zealand 700 years ago, the Mascarenes 400 years ago, and the Commander Islands 250 years ago. Nearly all of the world's isolated islands could furnish similar examples of extinctions occurring shortly after the arrival of humans, though most of these islands, such as the Hawaiian Islands, never had terrestrial megafauna, so their extinct fauna were smaller.

An analysis of the timing of Holarctic megafaunal extinctions and extirpations over the last 56,000 years has revealed a tendency for such events to cluster within interstadials, periods of abrupt warming, but only when humans were also present. Humans may have impeded processes of migration and recolonization that would otherwise have allowed the megafaunal species to adapt to the climate shift. In at least some areas, interstadials were periods of expanding human populations.

An analysis of Sporormiella fungal spores (which derive mainly from the dung of megaherbivores) in swamp sediment cores spanning the last 130,000 years from Lynch's Crater in Queensland, Australia, showed that the megafauna of that region virtually disappeared about 41,000 years ago, at a time when climate changes were minimal; the change was accompanied by an increase in charcoal, and was followed by a transition from rainforest to fire-tolerant sclerophyll vegetation. The high-resolution chronology of the changes supports the hypothesis that human hunting alone eliminated the megafauna, and that the subsequent change in flora was most likely a consequence of the elimination of browsers and an increase in fire. The increase in fire lagged the disappearance of megafauna by about a century, and most likely resulted from accumulation of fuel once browsing stopped. Over the next several centuries grass increased; sclerophyll vegetation increased with a lag of another century, and a sclerophyll forest developed after about another thousand years. During two periods of climate change about 120,000 and 75,000 years ago, sclerophyll vegetation had also increased at the site in response to a shift to cooler, drier conditions; neither of these episodes had a significant impact on megafaunal abundance. Similar conclusions regarding the culpability of human hunters in the disappearance of Pleistocene megafauna were derived from high-resolution chronologies obtained via an analysis of a large collection of eggshell fragments of the flightless Australian bird Genyornis newtoni, from analysis of Sporormiella fungal spores from a lake in eastern North America and from study of deposits of Shasta ground sloth dung left in over half a dozen caves in the American southwest.

Continuing human hunting and environmental disturbance has led to additional megafaunal extinctions in the recent past, and has created a serious danger of further extinctions in the near future (see examples below). Direct killing by humans, primarily for meat, is the most significant factor in contemporary megafaunal decline.

A number of other mass extinctions occurred earlier in Earth's geologic history, in which some or all of the megafauna of the time also died out. Famously, in the Cretaceous–Paleogene extinction event the non-avian dinosaurs and most other giant reptilians were eliminated. However, the earlier mass extinctions were more global and not so selective for megafauna; i.e., many species of other types, including plants, marine invertebrates and plankton, went extinct as well. Thus, the earlier events must have been caused by more generalized types of disturbances to the biosphere.

Consequences of depletion of megafauna

Effect on nutrient transport
Megafauna play a significant role in the lateral transport of mineral nutrients in an ecosystem, tending to translocate them from areas of high to those of lower abundance. They do so by their movement between the time they consume the nutrient and the time they release it through elimination (or, to a much lesser extent, through decomposition after death). In South America's Amazon Basin, it is estimated that such lateral diffusion was reduced over 98% following the megafaunal extinctions that occurred roughly 12,500 years ago. Given that phosphorus availability is thought to limit productivity in much of the region, the decrease in its transport from the western part of the basin and from floodplains (both of which derive their supply from the uplift of the Andes) to other areas is thought to have significantly impacted the region's ecology, and the effects may not yet have reached their limits. In the sea, cetaceans and pinnipeds that feed at depth are thought to translocate nitrogen from deep to shallow water, enhancing ocean productivity, and counteracting the activity of zooplankton, which tend to do the opposite.

Effect on methane emissions
Large populations of megaherbivores have the potential to contribute greatly to the atmospheric concentration of methane, which is an important greenhouse gas. Modern ruminant herbivores produce methane as a byproduct of foregut fermentation in digestion, and release it through belching or flatulence. Today, around 20% of annual methane emissions come from livestock methane release. In the Mesozoic, it has been estimated that sauropods could have emitted 520 million tons of methane to the atmosphere annually, contributing to the warmer climate of the time (up to 10 °C warmer than at present). This large emission follows from the enormous estimated biomass of sauropods, and because methane production of individual herbivores is believed to be almost proportional to their mass.

Recent studies have indicated that the extinction of megafaunal herbivores may have caused a reduction in atmospheric methane. This hypothesis is relatively new. One study examined the methane emissions from the bison that occupied the Great Plains of North America before contact with European settlers. The study estimated that the removal of the bison caused a decrease of as much as 2.2 million tons per year. Another study examined the change in the methane concentration in the atmosphere at the end of the Pleistocene epoch after the extinction of megafauna in the Americas. After early humans migrated to the Americas about 13,000 BP, their hunting and other associated ecological impacts led to the extinction of many megafaunal species there. Calculations suggest that this extinction decreased methane production by about 9.6 million tons per year. This suggests that the absence of megafaunal methane emissions may have contributed to the abrupt climatic cooling at the onset of the Younger Dryas. The decrease in atmospheric methane that occurred at that time, as recorded in ice cores, was 2-4 times more rapid than any other decrease in the last half million years, suggesting that an unusual mechanism was at work.

Examples
The following are some notable examples of animals often considered as megafauna (in the sense of the "large animal" definition). This list is not intended to be exhaustive:

Clade Synapsida
Class Mammalia (phylogenetically, a clade within Therapsida; see below)
Infraclass Metatheria
Order Diprotodontia
However, its extinct relative, the giant short-faced kangaroo Procoptodon goliah reached , while extinct diprotodonts attained the largest size of any marsupial in history, up to an estimated .
Infraclass Eutheria
Superorder Afrotheria
Order Proboscidea
Elephants are the largest living land animals. They and their relatives arose in Africa, but until recently had a nearly worldwide distribution. Among recently extinct proboscideans, mammoths (Mammuthus) were close relatives of elephants, while mastodons (Mammut) were much more distantly related. The Palaeoloxodon namadicus may have reached 5.2 meters in height and 22 tones in weight. This makes it the largest known terrestrial mammal.
Order Sirenia
Steller's sea cow (Hydrodamalis gigas) was probably around five times as massive, but was exterminated by humans within 27 years of its discovery off the remote Commander Islands in 1741. In prehistoric times this sea cow also lived along the coasts of northeastern Asia and northwestern North America; it was apparently eliminated from these more accessible locations by aboriginal hunters.
Superorder Xenarthra
Order Cingulata
The glyptodonts were a group of large, heavily armored ankylosaur-like xenarthrans related to living armadillos. They originated in South America, invaded North America during the Great American Interchange, and went extinct at the end of the Pleistocene epoch.
Order Pilosa
Ground sloths were another group of slow, terrestrial xenarthrans, related to modern tree sloths. They had a similar history, although they reached North America earlier, and spread farther north (e.g., Megalonyx). The largest genera, Megatherium and Eremotherium, reached sizes comparable to elephants.
Superorder Euarchontoglires
Order Primates
The extinct Malagasy sloth lemur Archaeoindris reached a similar size, while the extinct Gigantopithecus blacki of Southeast Asia is believed to have been larger yet, although probably less than twice as large, contrary to early estimates (the absence of postcranial remains makes its size difficult to judge). Some populations of archaic Homo were larger on average than recent Homo sapiens; for example, Neanderthals were about 30% more massive.
Order Rodentia
Several recently extinct North American forms were larger: the capybara Neochoerus pinckneyi (another Neotropic migrant) was about 40% heavier on average; the giant beaver (Castoroides ohioensis) was similar. The extinct blunt-toothed giant hutia (Amblyrhiza inundata) of several Caribbean islands may have been larger still. However, several million years ago South America harbored much more massive rodents. Phoberomys pattersoni, known from a nearly full skeleton, probably reached .
Superorder Laurasiatheria
Order Carnivora
The largest extant cats are in genus Panthera, including the tiger (P. tigris) and lion (P. leo). The Siberian tiger (P. t. altaica) should be the biggest wild cat according to Bergmann's rule, and has been regarded as such by some but this is disputable. Panthera species are distinguished by morphological features which enable them to roar. Larger extinct cats include the American lion (P. atrox) and the South American saber-toothed cat (Smilodon populator).
Bears are large carnivorans of the caniform suborder.
Seals, sea lions, and walruses are amphibious marine carnivorans that evolved from bearlike ancestors.
Order Perissodactyla
Tapirs are browsing animals, with a short prehensile snout and pig-like form that appears to have changed little in 20 million years. They inhabit tropical forests of Southeast Asia and South and Central America, and include the largest surviving land animals of the latter two regions. There are four species.
Rhinoceroses are odd-toed ungulates with horns made of keratin, the same type of protein composing hair. They are among the second-largest living land mammals at 850-3,800 kg. Three of five extant species are critically endangered. Their extinct central Asian relatives the indricotherines were the largest terrestrial mammals of all time.
Order Artiodactyla
The average weight is 1,192 kg (2,628 lb) for an adult male and 828 kg (1,825 lb) for an adult female with maximum weights of 1,930 kg (4,250 lb) and 1,180 kg (2,600 lb) recorded for males and females, respectively.
Bovine ungulates include the largest surviving land animals of Europe and North America.
The semiaquatic hippopotamus (Hippopotamus amphibius) is the heaviest living member of the order Cetartiodactyla after the cetaceans. Mean adult weight is around 1,500 kg (3,300 lb) and 1,300 kg (2,900 lb) for males and females respectively, with large males reaching over 3,200 kg (7,100 lb). The hippopotamus and the much smaller critically endangered pygmy hippo (Choeropsis liberiensis) are believed to be the closest extant relatives of cetaceans. Hippopotamuses are among the megafaunal species most dangerous to humans.
Infraorder Cetacea
Whales, dolphins, and porpoises are marine mammals. The sperm whale (Physeter macrocephalus) is the largest toothed whale and one of the largest predators in vertebrate history, as well as the planet's loudest and brainiest animal (with a brain about five times as massive as a human's).
Order Pelycosauria (traditional; paraphyletic)
Cotylorhynchus was a large, big-clawed, herbivorous caseid of Early Permian North America, reaching  and 2 tonnes.
Order Therapsida
 Anteosaurus was a headbutting, semiaquatic, carnivorous dinocephalian of Middle Permian South Africa.
 Lisowicia was an elephant-sized (9 tonne) herbivorous kannemeyeriiform dicynodont of Late Triassic Europe.
Clade Sauropsida
Class Aves (phylogenetically, a clade within Coelurosauria, a taxon within the order Saurischia; see below)
Order Struthioniformes
The ratites are an ancient and diverse group of flightless birds that are found on fragments of the former supercontinent Gondwana. The latter two are examples of island gigantism.
Order Gastornithiformes
Extinct dromornithids of Australia such as Dromornis approached the largest ratites in size. (Due to its small size for a continent and its isolation, Australia is sometimes viewed as the world's largest island; thus, these species could also be considered insular giants.)
Order Cathartiformes
Class Reptilia (traditional; paraphyletic)
Order Saurischia
Saurischian dinosaurs of the Jurassic and Cretaceous include sauropods, the longest (at up to ) and most massive terrestrial animals known (Argentinosaurus reached 80–100 metric tonnes, or 90–110 tons), as well as theropods, the largest terrestrial carnivores (Spinosaurus, the longest, grew to 15 meters; the more famous Tyrannosaurus, to 8.4 tonnes in weight).
Order Pterosauria
The former is thought to have been the apex predator of its island ecosystem.
Order Crocodilia
Crocodilians' distant ancestors and their kin, the pseudosuchians (traditional crurotarsans), dominated the world in the late Triassic, until the Triassic–Jurassic extinction event allowed dinosaurs to overtake them. They remained diverse during the later Mesozoic, when crocodyliforms such as Deinosuchus and Sarcosuchus reached lengths of 12 m. Similarly large crocodilians, such as Mourasuchus and Purussaurus, were present as recently as the Miocene in South America.
Order Squamata
While the largest extant lizard, the Komodo dragon (Varanus komodoensis), another island giant, can reach  in length, its extinct Australian relative Megalania may have reached more than twice that size. These monitor lizards' marine relatives, the mosasaurs, were apex predators in late Cretaceous seas.
The heaviest extant snake is considered to be the green anaconda (Eunectes murinus), while the reticulated python (Python reticulatus), at up to 8.7 m or more, is considered the longest.
Order Testudines
It is distinguished from other sea turtles by its lack of a bony shell. These tortoises are the biggest survivors of an assortment of giant tortoise species that were widely present on continental landmasses and additional islands during the Pleistocene.
Class Amphibia (in the wide, probably paraphyletic, sense)
Order Temnospondyli (relationship to extant amphibians is unclear)
The Permian temnospondyl Prionosuchus, the largest amphibian known, reached 9 m in length and was an aquatic predator resembling a crocodilian. After the appearance of real crocodilians, temnospondyls such as Koolasuchus (5 m long) had retreated to the Antarctic region by the Cretaceous, before going extinct.
Class Actinopterygii
Order Tetraodontiformes
While phylogenetically a "bony fish", its skeleton is primarily cartilage (which is lighter than bone). It has a disk-shaped body, and propels itself with its long, thin dorsal and anal fins; it feeds primarily on jellyfish. In these three respects (as well as in its size and diving habits), it resembles a leatherback turtle.
Order Lampriformes
The giant oarfish (Regalecus glesne) is the longest bony fish, reaching .
Order Acipenseriformes
Order Siluriformes
Class Chondrichthyes
Order Lamniformes
Its extinct relative O. megalodon was more than an order of magnitude larger, and is the largest predatory shark or fish of all time (and one of the largest predators in vertebrate history); it preyed on whales and other marine mammals.
Order Orectolobiformes
Like baleen whales, it is a filter feeder and primarily consumes plankton.
Order Rajiformes
The manta ray  (Manta birostris) is another filter feeder and the largest ray, growing to up to 2300 kg.
Class Placodermi
Order Arthrodira
The largest armored fish, Dunkleosteus, arose during the late Devonian. Its contemporary, Titanichthys, apparently an early filter feeder, rivaled it in size. The arthrodires were eliminated by the environmental upheavals of the Late Devonian extinction, after existing for only about 50 million years.
Class Cephalopoda
Order Ammonitida
The Late Cretaceous ammonite Parapuzosia seppenradensis reached a shell diameter of over 2 m.
Order Teuthida
A number of deep ocean creatures exhibit abyssal gigantism. The latter is the world's largest invertebrate, and has the largest eyes of any animal. Both are preyed upon by sperm whales.
Stem-group Arthropoda
Order Radiodonta
Anomalocarids were a group of very early legless marine arthropods that included the largest predators of the Cambrian, such as Anomalocaris. By the early Ordovician they had evolved into giant (for the time) filter feeders, apparently in response to the proliferation of plankton during the Great Ordovician Biodiversification Event. Aegirocassis grew to over 2 m in length.
Order Eurypterida
Eurypterids (sea scorpions) were a diverse group of aquatic and possibly amphibious predators that included the most massive arthropods to have existed. They survived over 200 million years, but finally died out in the Permian–Triassic extinction event along with trilobites and most other forms of life present at the time, including most of the dominant terrestrial therapsids.

Gallery

Extinct

Extant

See also

Australian megafauna
Bergmann's rule
Charismatic megafauna
Cope's rule
Deep-sea gigantism
Fauna
Island dwarfism
Island gigantism
Largest organisms
Largest prehistoric animals
List of heaviest land mammals
List of largest mammals
List of megafauna discovered in modern times
Megafauna (mythology)
Megafaunal wolf
Megaflora
Megaherb
New World Pleistocene extinctions
Pleistocene megafauna
Quaternary extinction event

Notes

References
https://inauralist.ala.org.

External links
 Megafauna  – "First Victims of the Human-Caused Extinction"

Extinction
Zoology
Animal size